The 2006 FIBA World Championship Final was a basketball game between the men's national teams of Greece and the Spain that took place on September 3, 2006, at the Saitama Super Arena in Saitama, Japan.

It was the first Final appearance for Spain, whose best achievement in the World Cup was the fourth place in 1982. Greece also made its first Final appearance, after finishing fourth in the last two tournaments.

Spain won the Final 47–70, and won its first World Cup title. Also, Spain qualified for the 2008 Summer Olympics.

Route to the final

Match details
Spain had to play the Final without their star player, later to be named tournament MVP, Pau Gasol, who suffered partial fracture of his fifth metatarsal in his left foot in the Semi-final against Argentina. Greece just came off a stunning victory against the United States in their Semi-final.

References

External links
 
 

Final
Greece national basketball team games
Spain national basketball team games
Sport in Saitama (city)
2006–07 in Spanish basketball
2006–07 in Greek basketball
2007
September 2006 sports events in Asia